Slovakia competed at the 2008 Summer Paralympics in Beijing.

Slovak competitors won medals in table tennis, shooting, and cycling.

Medallists

Sports

Archery

Men

|-
|align=left|Imrich Lyocsa
|rowspan=2 align=left|Men's individual recurve standing
|602
|10
|W 95-73
|W 100-94
|L 95-98
|colspan=3|did not advance
|-
|align=left|Vladimir Majercak
|546
|22
|L 87-88
|colspan=5|did not advance
|-
|align=left|Miroslav Kacina
|align=left|Men's individual recurve W1/W2
|566
|21
|L 83-96
|colspan=5|did not advance
|-
|align=left|Miroslav Kacina Imrich Lyocsa Vladimir Majercak
|align=left|Men's team recurve
|1714
|9
|
|L 181-185
|colspan=4|did not advance
|}

Athletics

Men's field

Women's track

Boccia

Cycling

Men's road

Men's track

Equestrian

Powerlifting

Men

Women

Shooting

Men

Women

Swimming

Women

Table tennis

Men

Women

Teams

Wheelchair tennis

See also
Slovakia at the Paralympics
Slovakia at the 2008 Summer Olympics

External links
Beijing 2008 Paralympic Games Official Site
International Paralympic Committee

References

Nations at the 2008 Summer Paralympics
2008
Paralympics